William Frederick Meyers, (September 3, 1848 – 1912) was a Canadian politician. He served on the Legislative Assembly of the Northwest Territories for Kinistino from 1891 to 1905.

Meyers was a native of Trenton, Ontario. A member of the Church of England, he was a farmer and rancher. Though he was politically affiliated with the Conservative Party of Canada, he was opposed to partisanship in the Legislative Assembly.

He was elected in 1891 to the Legislative Assembly of the Northwest Territories, and served until the dissolution of the legislature in 1905 when the territory was split into Alberta and Saskatchewan.

Electoral results

1891 election

1894 election

1898 election

1902 election

References

1848 births
1912 deaths
Members of the Legislative Assembly of the Northwest Territories
Canadian Anglicans